Moodnopsis perangusta is a species of snout moth in the genus Moodnopsis. It is found in Trinidad.

References

Moths described in 1919
Phycitinae